Mr. and Mrs. Juan Lamaglia (Spanish:Juan Lamaglia y señora) is a 1970 Argentine film written by Héctor Grossi and Raúl de la Torre and directed by Raúl de la Torre.

It was released in Argentina on April 28, 1970.

Raúl de la Torre was awarded the Special Jury Award at the 1970 Mar del Plata Film Festival and the film itself won the Silver Condor for Best Film (Mejor Película) at the 1971 Argentine Film Critics Association Awards.

Cast
 José Soriano as Juan Lamaglia
 Julia von Grolman as Señora Lamaglia

References

External links
 

1970 films
Argentine drama films
1970s Spanish-language films
Films directed by Raúl de la Torre
1970s Argentine films